The Cabuyao City Council is Cabuyao's Sangguniang Panlungsod or legislative body. The council has twelve members which is composed of ten councilors, one ex officio member elected from the ranks of barangay (neighborhood) chairmen and one presiding officer. The Vice-mayor of the city is the presiding officer of the council, who is elected citywide.

The council is responsible for creating laws and ordinances under the city's jurisdiction. The mayor can veto proposed bills, but the council can override it with a two-thirds supermajority.

The council meets at the Session Hall of the Cabuyao City Hall for their regular sessions.



Membership

Each of Cabuyao's ten city councilors were elected at large by the voters of the city. In addition, the barangay chairmen and the SK chairmen throughout the city elect amongst themselves their representatives to the council. Hence, there are 12 councilors.

City council elections are synchronized with other elections in the country. Elections are held every first Monday of May every third year since 1992.

Current members
As the presiding officer, Vice Mayor Leif Laiglon A. Opiña (Lakas-CMD) can only vote to break ties.

The parties as stated in the 2022 elections.

Past members

2019–2022 membership

2016–2019 membership

2013–2016 membership

Standing Committees
There is a total of twenty seven (27) standing committees in the city council. Each committee is headed and co-headed by a member of the city council.

Prominent councilors
 Rommel Gecolea, city mayor
 Jose Benson Aguillo, vice mayor
 Benjamin C. del Rosario, former vice mayor
 Tutti Caringal, 6 Cycle Mind lead vocalist

See also
Cabuyao
Mayors of Cabuyao

References

External links
Official Website of the City of Cabuyao

City councils in the Philippines
Cabuyao